= Zofia Eleonora Klengel =

German aristocrat

Zofia Eleonora Klengel (1674-1755), was a German aristocrat. She is known as the first known mistress of Augustus II the Strong in 1692–1695.
